Roja is a village in Talsi Municipality in the Courland region of Latvia.

References

Towns and villages in Latvia
Talsi Municipality
Courland